Jhalawar Medical College, Jhalawar is a public  Medical College situated in the city Jhalawar, of the Indian state Rajasthan. The new Hospital and College started functioning from 27 March 2008.  The first MBBS batch of 100 students was admitted in 2008 through RPMT& AIPMT Since 2016 college got permission by MCI for 150 students per year. Now, from 2019, college admits 200 students per year.

Jhalawar medical College also have PG course in various departments.

See also
 Colleges and institutes in India

References

External links
 Jhalawar Medical College official webpage

Medical colleges in Rajasthan
Education in Jhalawar district
Educational institutions established in 2007
2007 establishments in Rajasthan
Jhalawar
Affiliates of Rajasthan University of Health Sciences